Oyda is an Afro-Asiatic language spoken in the Gamo Gofa Zone of Ethiopia.

The 2007 Census of Ethiopia lists 45,120 individuals for the ethnic group.

References

External links 
 DoBeS Oyda Documentation Project

North Omotic languages
Languages of Ethiopia